Chris Morris (born February 22, 1983) is a former American football guard and center. He was drafted by the Oakland Raiders in the seventh round of the 2006 NFL Draft. He played college football at Michigan State.

He has also been a member of the Carolina Panthers, New England Patriots, Detroit Lions and Tennessee Titans.

Early years
Morris played high school football at Bedford High School in Temperance, Michigan.

Professional career

Oakland Raiders
Drafted in the seventh round by the Oakland Raiders in 2006. Waived in 2009

New England Patriots
Morris signed with the New England Patriots on August 3, 2011, but was released on August 13.

Detroit Lions
On August 24, 2011, Morris signed with the Detroit Lions. He was released on September 4.

Tennessee Titans
Morris was signed by the Tennessee Titans on August 4, 2012.

External links
Oakland Raiders bio
Michigan State Spartans bio 

1983 births
Living people
Players of American football from Michigan
American football centers
American football offensive guards
Michigan State Spartans football players
Oakland Raiders players
Carolina Panthers players
New England Patriots players
Detroit Lions players
Tennessee Titans players
People from Lambertville, Michigan